Autumn Ball is a 2007 Estonian drama film directed by Veiko Õunpuu, adapted from Mati Unt's 1979 novel of the same name. The film depicts six desolate people of different yet similar fates in characteristically Soviet pre-fabricated housing units (khrushchyovka). It premiered at the 64th Venice International Film Festival, where it won the Horizon Award.

Cast
 Rain Tolk as Mati
 Taavi Eelmaa as Theo
 Tiina Tauraite as Ulvi
 Maarja Jakobson as Laura
 Mirtel Pohla as Jaana
 Sulevi Peltola as August Kaski
 Iris Persson as Laura's daughter
 Juhan Ulfsak as Maurer
 Ivo Uukkivi as Laura's ex-husband
 Katariina Lauk as female conference visitor
 Paul Laasik as television repairman

References

External links

2007 films
Estonian-language films
2007 drama films
Films based on Estonian novels
Estonian drama films